This list of rail accidents in Egypt provides details of significant railway crashes in Egypt involving railway rolling stocks.

List

References

Sources
 
 

 
Egypt
Train accidents
Lists of events in Egypt